Trent Hindman (born September 20, 1995 in West Long Branch, New Jersey) is an American racing driver. Hindman won the 2014 Continental Tire Sports Car Challenge in the GS class. He also was selected by BMW Motorsport for their junior program in 2015.

Career

Karting
Hindman started karting at eight years old at his local kart track Old Bridge Township Raceway Park. In 2004, Hindman competed in the Junior Sportsman category at Old Bridge Township Raceway Park. The young driver won the category in 2006 at the local track and also the New Jersey state championship. In the same year Hindman also made his debut in the World Karting Association. Trent Hindman won his first national karting championship in 2008. The young talent won the Stars of Karting national championship in the Cadet class. In 2009 Hindman achieved podium classifications in various World Karting Association classes.

Formula racing
In 2009 Hindman completed the Skip Barber Racing School with driver coach Steve Welk. He subsequently ran his first race at Road America where he finished fifth. Trent finishes fourth in the final point standings of the Skip Barber Southern Series. He continued competing in the Skip Barber National Championship throughout 2010 and 2011. In 2011 Hindman won two races at Lime Rock Park and one race at Autobahn Country Club marking his first wins in autosport. He ended up second in the point standings, behind Scott Anderson, but in front of Brandon Newey. The talented driver in 2011 selected for the Mazdaspeed Motorsports Development Driver program, was highly successful in the Ontario Formula Ford Championship. Running with Brian Graham Racing Hindman won nine out of twelve races. He also competed at the Formula Ford Festival finishing ninth.

For 2012 Hindman joined the Mazda Road to Indy competing in the USF2000. Running with Cape Motorsports with Wayne Taylor Racing Hindman scored two podium finishes and ended up fifth in the 2012 final standings.

Touring cars
After his USF2000 campaign Hindman focussed on GT racing and touring cars. For 2013 Hindman competed full-time in the amateur based SCCA Majors Tour in the GT2 class. Racing with Fall-Line Motorsports in a Porsche 911 GT3 997 Hindman won eight races and clinched the SCCA Nationwide championship. During the season Hindman won the prestigious SCCA June Sprints and achieved a second place at the SCCA National Championship Runoffs. He also competed in the Continental Tire Sports Car Challenge in the GS class in a BMW M3 achieving one podium at Mazda Raceway Laguna Seca. The following year Hindman won the championship after winning races at Laguna Seca and Circuit of the Americas.

For 2015 Hindman again raced in the Continental Tire Sports Car Challenge. Hindman also made his debut in the 24 Hours of Zolder. At the Belgian racetrack Hindman was part of the BMW Motorsport Junior team competing in a 2016 edition BMW M235i Cup Racer. Together with Louis Deletraz, Victor Bouveng and driver coach Dirk Adorf the team supported by Walkenhorst Motorsport finished fifteenth overall, ninth in class.

Personal
Hindman resides in the Wayside section of Ocean Township, Monmouth County, New Jersey, where he attended Ocean Township High School.

Racing record

SCCA National Championship Runoffs

U.S. F2000 National Championship
(key)

Complete IMSA SportsCar Championship results

24 Hours of Zolder

References

External links
 Official website
 Facebook profile

1995 births
Living people
Formula Ford drivers
SCCA National Championship Runoffs participants
British Formula Renault 2.0 drivers
Ocean Township High School alumni
People from Ocean Township, Monmouth County, New Jersey
People from West Long Branch, New Jersey
Racing drivers from New Jersey
Sportspeople from Monmouth County, New Jersey
U.S. F2000 National Championship drivers
24 Hours of Daytona drivers
GT World Challenge America drivers
Formula Renault BARC drivers
Wayne Taylor Racing drivers
Meyer Shank Racing drivers
WeatherTech SportsCar Championship drivers
Michelin Pilot Challenge drivers
24H Series drivers